Marguerite Ogden Wilkinson (14 November 1883 – 12 January 1928) was an American poet.

She was born Marguerite Ogden Bigelow in 1883 in Halifax, Nova Scotia, the daughter of Nathan Kellogg Bigelow and Gertrude (Holmes) Bigelow. Her family moved to Evanston, Illinois while she was young, and she attended Northwestern University, where she started writing poetry. Wilkinson was a member of the university's Magazine Board and was editor of the annual issue of The Northwestern published by women of the university.

In 1909, she married James G. Wilkinson and moved with him to New Rochelle, New York, where he was a school principal.

She published several books of poetry, the most important being In Vivid Gardens, a collection of love poems. Other works included By a Western Wayside and The Passing of Mars. She was editor of the poetry page in the Los Angeles Graphic newspaper and the monthly Books and Authors, published in New York.

In 1928, she suffered a nervous breakdown. As part of her recovery, she took up swimming. In the winter of that year, Wilkinson drowned while swimming at Coney Island, New York.

References

1883 births
1928 deaths
American women poets
Writers from Halifax, Nova Scotia
Writers from New York City
The New York Times people
Deaths by drowning in the United States
People from Evanston, Illinois
Northwestern University alumni
Journalists from Illinois
American women non-fiction writers